The Ending Qualified Immunity Act is a proposed United States Act of Congress first introduced in 2020 by Justin Amash (L-Michigan) and Ayanna Pressley (D-Massachusetts) to end qualified immunity in the United States. Qualified immunity shields police officers and other government officials from being held personally liable for discretionary actions performed within their official capacity (even if those actions violate the civil rights of those affected) unless their actions violate "clearly established" federal law, a precedent requiring both that those actions violate written law and that there be a judicial precedent establishing that such actions are unlawful.

The bill was re-introduced in the 117th Congress by Rep. Pressley in the House of Representatives and by Sen. Edward Markey in the Senate.

History 
The bill was introduced to the House of Representatives on June 2, 2020. In introducing the act, Amash explained:
This week, I am introducing the Ending Qualified Immunity Act to eliminate qualified immunity and restore Americans' ability to obtain relief when police officers violate their constitutionally secured rights. The brutal killing of George Floyd by Minneapolis police is merely the latest in a long line of incidents of egregious police misconduct. This pattern continues because police are legally, politically, and culturally insulated from consequences for violating the rights of the people whom they have sworn to serve. That must change so that these incidents of brutality stop happening.

, the Ending Qualified Immunity Act had 66 cosponsors, of whom Representative McClintock is the only Republican. The bill's sponsorship by members of the Libertarian, Republican, and Democratic parties makes it a tripartisan bill.

Background 

Qualified immunity is a legal doctrine in United States federal law which shields government officials from being held personally liable for discretionary actions performed within their official capacity, unless their actions violate "clearly established" federal law—even if the victim's civil rights were violated. The U.S. Supreme Court first introduced the qualified immunity doctrine in 1967, originally with the rationale of protecting law enforcement officials from frivolous lawsuits and financial liability in cases where they acted in good faith in unclear legal situations. Starting around 2005, courts increasingly applied the doctrine to cases involving the use of excessive or deadly force by police, leading to widespread criticism that it, in the words of a 2020 Reuters report, "has become a nearly failsafe tool to let police brutality go unpunished and deny victims their constitutional rights".

References 

Proposed legislation of the 116th United States Congress
Proposed legislation of the 117th United States Congress
Police misconduct in the United States
United States proposed federal civil rights legislation